Centralite (empirical formula: C17H20N2O) is a gunshot residue also known as ethyl centralite. Its IUPAC name is 1,3-diethyl-1,3-diphenylurea. Ethyl centralite is insoluble in water, but is soluble in acetone, ethanol and benzene. It is mainly used as a burning rate moderator and stabilizer for smokeless powder, and also a plasticizer for celluloid.

Naming

Synonyms 
Bis(N-ethyl-N-phenyl)urea; Carbamite; Centralit; Centralite; Centralite1; Centralite 1; Centralite-1; Centralite I; N,N′-Diethylcarbanilide; Diethyldiphenylharnstoff; N,N′-Diethyl-N′-diphenyl-L-harnstoff; 1,3-Diethyl-1,3-diphenylharnstoff; Diethyldiphenylurea; 1,3-Diethyldiphenylurea; 1,3-Diethyl-1,3-diphenylurea; s-Diethyldiphenylurea; sym-Diethyldiphenylurea; N,N′-Diphenyl-N,N′-diethylharnstoff; N,N′-Diphenyl-N,N′-diethylurea; Ethylcentralit; Ethylcentralite; Ethyl centralite; USAF EK-1047; Zentralit.

The term "Centralite" was originally applied to dimethyldiphenylurea developed about 1906 at the German Central War Laboratory Zentralstelle für wissenschaftlich-technische Untersuchungen in Neubabelsberg as a deterrent coating for smokeless powder in military rifle cartridges.  Thereafter, all hydrocarbon-substituted symmetrical diphenyl urea compounds used as smokeless powder deterrents (or moderants) were called centralites after the laboratory.  The preferred ethyl centralite became known as Centralite No. 1 and the original methyl centralite was identified as Centralite No. 2.  Butyl centralite was also used as a celluloid plasticizer.

Its reaction history is considerably more complicated than that of diphenylurea. Ending up with nitrated anilines, the methyl analog centralite-2 or sym-dimethyldiphenylurea is also known and is used somewhat abroad. The centralite are considered to be somewhat less effective as stabilizers than 2-nitrodiphenylamine, but they are also quite good plasticizers. When found in propellants they are frequently used at higher fractions than the diphenylamines to take advantage of their plasticizing properties.

References

External links
Fine Chemicals & Intermediates : Ethyl Centralite

Ureas
Plasticizers